The 1961 NAIA Soccer Championship was the third annual tournament held by the NAIA to determine the national champion of men's college soccer among its members in the United States.

Howard defeated defending co-national champions Newark Engineering in the final, 3–2, to win their first NAIA national title. 

The final was played at Lock Haven State College in Lock Haven, Pennsylvania.

Bracket

See also  
 1961 NCAA Soccer Championship

References 

NAIA championships
NAIA
NAIA
1961 in sports in Pennsylvania